This article lists the winners and nominees for the Black Reel Award for Outstanding Independent Short Film. This award is given to the directors and was first awarded during the 2010 ceremony. Notable winners and nominees includes Spike Lee, Gabourey Sidibe, Matthew A. Cherry & Ryan Coogler.

Winners and nominees
Winners are listed first and highlighted in bold.

2010s

2020s

Multiple nominations and wins

Multiple nominations

 2 Nominations
 Jennia Fredrique
 Kofi Siriboe
 Ya'Ke Smith

References

Black Reel Awards